Bustin' Out of L Seven is Rick James' second studio album on Motown sub-label Gordy Records.  Included on the album is the top ten R&B hit, "Bustin' Out (On Funk)". L7 is slang for "square", as in the opening lyrics of "Bustin' Out (On Funk)", "Well, alright, you squares, it's time you smoked,
Fire up this funk and let's have a toke". The letter L and the number 7 form a square.

Track listing
All tracks composed by Rick James.

Side A
"Bustin' Out" - 5:24
"High on Your Love Suite/One Mo Hit (Of Your Love)" - 7:24
"Love Interlude" - 1:57
"Spacey Love" - 5:50

Side B
"Cop N Blow" - 5:04
"Jefferson Ball" - 7:21
"Fool on the Street" - 7:20

2014 digital remaster bonus track
"Bustin' Out (12" Extended Mix) - 7:21

2014 Complete Motown Albums bonus tracks
"Bustin' Out (12" Extended Mix) - 7:21
 "Bustin' Out (12" Instrumental) - 5:24

Personnel
Rick James - vocals, guitar, bass, keyboards, percussion
Oscar Alston - bass
Levi Ruffin - synthesizer, percussion
Wally Ali - guitar on "Cop 'N' Blow"
Ernie Fields, Jr. - saxophone
Michael Brecker - saxophone
Randy Brecker - trumpet
Fred Jackson, Jr. - alto saxophone, alto flute
Al Szymanski - guitar
Lanise Hughes - drums, percussion
Lorenzo Shaw - drums, percussion
Shondra Akiem - percussion
Maxine Willard Waters - background vocals
Clydene Jackson - background vocals
Fernando Harkness - tenor saxophone on "High on Your Love Suite" and "Fool on the Street"
Garnett Brown - trombone
Dorothy Ashby - harp on "Spacey Love" and "Jefferson Ball"
Clarence Sims - keyboards, percussion
Wayne Jackson - trumpet on "Spacey Love" and "Fool on the Street"
Jackie Ruffin - percussion
Oscar Brashear - trombone
George Bohanon - trombone
Teena Marie - background vocals
Billy Nunn, Bobby Nunn - keyboards, Freddie Rappilo - guitar, Richard Shaw - bass, Lorenzo Shaw - drums on "High on Your Love Suite"
Julia Tillman Waters - background vocals
Bobby Nunn, Billy Nunn, Sascha Meeks, Richard Shaw, Jackie Ruffin - background vocals on "High on Your Love Suite"

Charts

Album

Singles

References

External links
 Rick James-Bustin' Out of L Seven at Discogs

1979 albums
Rick James albums
Albums produced by Rick James
Gordy Records albums
Albums recorded at Sigma Sound Studios
Albums produced by Art Stewart